IP-XACT is an XML format that defines and describes individual, re-usable electronic circuit designs (individual pieces of intellectual property, or IPs) to facilitate their use in creating integrated circuits (i.e. microchips). IP-XACT was created by the SPIRIT Consortium as a standard to enable automated configuration and integration through tools.

The goals of the standard are
 to ensure delivery of compatible component descriptions from multiple component vendors,
 to enable exchanging complex component libraries between electronic design automation (EDA) tools for SoC design (design environments),
 to describe configurable components using metadata, and
 to enable the provision of EDA vendor-neutral scripts for component creation and configuration (generators, configurators).

Approved as IEEE 1685-2009 on December 9, 2009, published on February 18, 2010.
Superseded by IEEE 1685-2014. IEEE 1685-2009 was adopted as IEC 62014-4:2015.

Overview 

All documents will have the following basic titular attributes spirit:vendor, spirit:library, spirit:name, spirit:version.

A document typically represents one of:
 bus specification, giving its signals and protocol etc.;
 leaf IP block data sheet;
 or a hierarchic component wiring diagram that describes a sub-system by connecting up or abstracting other components made up of spirit:componentInstance and spirit:interconnection elements.

For each port of a component there will be a spirit:busInterface element in the document.  This may have a spirit:signalMap
that gives the mapping of the formal net names in the interface to the names used in a corresponding formal specification of the port.
A simple wiring tool will use the signal map to know which net on one interface to connect to which net on another instance
of the same formal port on another component.

There may be various versions of a component referenced in the document, each as a spirit:view element, relating to different versions of a design: typical levels are gate-level, RTL and TLM.
Each view typically contains a list of filenames as a spirit:fileSet that implement the design at that level of abstraction in appropriate language, like Verilog,
C++ or PSL.

Non-functional data present includes the programmer's view with a list of spirit:register declarations inside a spirit:memoryMap or spirit:addressBlock.

Supporting companies and software 
Agnisys 
Magillem 
Defacto Technologies 
Semifore, Inc 
Synopsys, Inc 
EDAUtils 
Cadence - JasperGold  and Interconnect Workbench (IWB) 
Xilinx
Lattice

See also 
SystemRDL

References

Further reading
 SPIRIT IP-XACT Controlled ESL Design Tool Applied to a Network-on-Chip Platform

External links 
 IP-XACT at Accellera
 XML Schema at Accellera
 BusDefs at Accellera
 IEEE 1685-2014 - free download of the standard.

Electronic engineering
IEEE DASC standards
IEC standards